San Felice del Benaco is a comune in the province of Brescia, in Lombardy, northern Italy. The name derives most likely from the Latin sinus felix, meaning "pleasant harbour".

It is located on the western shore of the Lake Garda. The Isola del Garda, the largest island in the lake, is part of the municipality of San Felice. It is bounded by the municipalities of Salò, Puegnago sul Garda and Manerba del Garda.

Main sights

Sanctuary of the Madonna del Carmine, dating from the 15th century. It is a late example of  Lombard Gothic architecture.
Parish church (1740-1781). It houses frescoes by Carlo Innocenzo Carloni.
Remains of the castle.
Church of San Fermo (15th century), at Portese.
Remains of the castle of Portese.
abandoned spring factory "mollificio bresciano" by Vittoriano Viganò an important Italian architect.

Sources

Cities and towns in Lombardy
Populated places on Lake Garda